Yevgeni Safonov (born 8 December 1985) is a Kazakhstani cross-country skier. He competed in the men's sprint event at the 2006 Winter Olympics.

References

1985 births
Living people
Kazakhstani male cross-country skiers
Olympic cross-country skiers of Kazakhstan
Cross-country skiers at the 2006 Winter Olympics
People from Akmola Region
21st-century Kazakhstani people